Eduard Meyer (25 January 1855 – 31 August 1930) was a German historian. He was the brother of Celticist Kuno Meyer (1858–1919).

Biography
Meyer was born in Hamburg and educated at the Gelehrtenschule des Johanneums and later at the universities of Bonn and Leipzig. After completing his studies, he spent one year in Istanbul. In 1879, he went to the University of Leipzig as privatdocent. He was appointed professor of ancient history at Breslau in 1885, at Halle in 1889, and at Berlin in 1902. He lectured at Harvard in 1909 and the University of Illinois, Urbana-Champaign in 1910. Honorary degrees were given him by Oxford, St. Andrews, Freiburg, and Chicago universities.

He died in Berlin.

Egyptology
In 1904 Meyer was the first to note the Sothic cycle of the Heliacal rising of Sirius, which forms the basis for the traditional chronology of Egypt.

Works
His principal work is his "Geschichte des Altertums" (1884-1902; third edition, 1913). He also published:
 Forschungen zur alten Geschichte (1892-1899) – Research of ancient history.
 Untersuchungen zur Geschichte der Gracchen (1894) – Investigations on the history of the Gracchi.
 Wirtschaftliche Entwicklung des Altertums (1895) – Economic development of the ancient world.
 Die Entstehung des Judentums (1896) – The origins of Judaism.
 Zur Theorie und Methodik der Geschichte (1902) – Theory and methodology of history.
 Israeliten und ihre Nachbarstämme (1906) – The Israelites and their neighboring tribes.
 Theopomps Hellenika (1909) – Theopompus' Hellenics.
 Der Papyrosfund in Elephantine (1912) – The papyrus discovery from Elephantine.
 Ursprung und Geschichte der Mormonen (1912) – Origin and history of the Mormons.
 Nordamerika und Deutschland (1915) – North America and Germany.

In English translation
 "Alexander the Great and Universal Monarchy," The International Quarterly, Vol. VIII (1903).
 England; its Political Organization and Development and the War Against Germany (1916).

He was also a contributor to the Encyclopaedia Biblica (1903) and 1911 Encyclopædia Britannica; as well as to sections of The Historians' History of the World.

Notes

References
 
 
 Calder, William Musgrave and Alexander Demandt, ed. (1990). Eduard Meyer: Leben und Leistung eines Universalhistorikers. Leiden: BRILL.

External links
 
 
 Complete German text of Meyer's Geschichte des Altertums ("History of antiquity")
 

Writers from Hamburg
German antiquarians
1855 births
1930 deaths
Harvard University staff
University of Bonn alumni
Leipzig University alumni
Academic staff of the University of Halle
Academic staff of the Humboldt University of Berlin
People educated at the Gelehrtenschule des Johanneums
Recipients of the Pour le Mérite (civil class)
German male non-fiction writers
Corresponding Fellows of the British Academy